The Gambia is divided into eight local government areas.  They are:

Banjul
Basse
Brikama
Janjanbureh
Kanifing
Kerewan
Kuntaur
Mansakonko

See also
Divisions of the Gambia
List of local government areas of the Gambia by Human Development Index

Local Government Areas of the Gambia